Kai Ellis (born August 7, 1980) is a former American Canadian Football League defensive end. He most recently played for the Edmonton Eskimos of the Canadian Football League. He was signed by the San Francisco 49ers as an undrafted free agent in 2003. He played collegiately at Washington.

Ellis also played for the Calgary Stampeders, Ottawa Renegades, and Montreal Alouettes.

External links
Washington Huskies bio
Winnipeg Blue Bombers bio

1980 births
Living people
Sportspeople from Kent, Washington
American football defensive ends
American football linebackers
American players of Canadian football
Canadian football defensive linemen
Canadian football linebackers
Washington Huskies football players
San Francisco 49ers players
Calgary Stampeders players
Montreal Alouettes players
Winnipeg Blue Bombers players
Sportspeople from King County, Washington
Players of American football from Washington (state)
San Jose SaberCats players